Lost Heroes may refer to:

Bletchley Park’s Lost Heroes, a 2011 programme on BBC
Lost Heroes (ロストヒーローズ) a 2012 video game in the Compati Hero series 
"Lost Heroes" (episode), the series finale of The Batman released in 2008

See also
Isle of Lost Heroes, a fictional setting in the 1995 book Mydnight's Hero
Lone Survivor: The Eyewitness Account of Operation Redwing and the Lost Heroes of SEAL Team 10, a 2007 book by Marcus Luttrell
Quest for Lost Heroes, a 1990 book by David Gemmell